Cher Lloyd (born 28 July 1993) is an English singer. She finished fourth place in the seventh series of The X Factor in 2010. Following the seventh series finale, Lloyd was signed to Syco Music. Her debut single, "Swagger Jagger", was released in July 2011 and entered at number one on the UK Singles Chart. Lloyd's second single, "With Ur Love", was released in October 2011, and peaked at number four on the UK Singles Chart. Her debut studio album, Sticks and Stones, had two releases: its standard edition and a US version. The album peaked at number four on the UK Albums Chart, while the latter version debuted at number nine in the US Billboard 200. 

Lloyd signed to US record label Epic Records in 2011 and achieved mainstream success in the US with the solo version of her single "Want U Back", which reached the top 20 on the Billboard Hot 100. She released her second studio album, Sorry I'm Late in May 2014, preceded by the lead single, "I Wish". The album failed to match the success of its predecessor, peaking at number 21 on the UK Albums Chart and number 12 on the Billboard 200. After a collaboration with singer Demi Lovato, Lloyd had a two-year absence from the music industry.

In July 2016, Lloyd released the single "Activated", which was described as a "memo of Cher to her fans to say she is back and she is stronger than ever". She released the singles "None of My Business" and "M.I.A." in 2018 and 2019, respectively.

Early life
Cher Lloyd was raised in Malvern, Worcestershire, with her parents Darren and Diane and her three younger siblings, Sophie, Josh, and Rosie. Her family is of Romani origin, and Lloyd spent the first year of her life travelling around Wales with her young parents in a caravan. Speaking to former Now magazine, her uncle said she was teased and bullied by classmates due to her origins. Lloyd attended The Chase School, Malvern, and later Dyson Perrins High School, where she studied performing arts. She also attended the theater arts school Stagecoach.

Career

2010–2011: The X Factor

Lloyd had previously auditioned for The X Factor before (when the minimum age was lower), singing ballads, but did not make it through. She had previously performed at holiday camps and said she received a mixed reaction to her music, but was a big hit with X Factor judges at the time. She auditioned singing the Keri Hilson version of "Turn My Swag On" by Soulja Boy. At bootcamp she sang a rap version of "Viva La Vida". At the judges' houses, she performed "Cooler Than Me" but suffered from tonsillitis and was unable to complete the song.

Lloyd sang a rendition of "Just Be Good to Me" in the first of the live shows. In the second live show, she performed "Hard Knock Life (Ghetto Anthem)." In the third live show, she sang a mashup of "No Diggity" and "Shout", and in the fourth live show, she sang "Stay." This was the first time Lloyd did not rap in her performance, and Cowell even called it "the performance of the series." In week five, Lloyd sang "Empire State of Mind", but the judges stated that after the previous week they were disappointed. However, they agreed that she redeemed herself with her rendition of "Sorry Seems to Be the Hardest Word" mixed with "Mockingbird", by Elton John and Eminem, respectively, in week 6. In the seventh week, Lloyd was in the bottom two for the first time after her rendition of "Imagine", but Cowell, Cole and Walsh all saved her in the final showdown. In the following week, Lloyd performed "Girlfriend", followed by "Walk This Way". Both performances were credited by the judges, and she was saved by the public vote the following night, securing her position in the semifinal. In the semifinal, Lloyd performed "Nothin' on You" and "Love the Way You Lie" and was in the bottom two with Mary Byrne. She was saved by the judges again and put through to the final. In the final, she performed a mashup of "The Clapping Song" and "Get Ur Freak On", followed by a duet with will.i.am, which was a mashup of "Where Is the Love?" and "I Gotta Feeling." Lloyd was then eliminated in fourth place, having received the fewest public votes.

Lloyd and nine other contestants from the series participated in the X Factor Live Tour from February 2011 to April 2011. The tour saw Lloyd performing for 500,000 people throughout the UK.

2011–2012: Sticks and Stones
After the finale of the seventh series of The X Factor, it was announced that Lloyd had been signed to Syco Music. Shortly after, recording began for her debut studio album with songwriter Autumn Rowe, and producers RedOne, Johnny Powers and The Runners. On 28 July 2011, Lloyd previewed five tracks from the album during a UStream session, including singles featuring Busta Rhymes, Mike Posner, Ghetts, Mic Righteous and Dot Rotten.

Lloyd's debut single, "Swagger Jagger", was released in July 2011 and entered at number one on the UK Singles Chart, with sales exceeding 303,000 copies in Britain. In the Republic of Ireland, the single charted at number two on the Irish Singles Chart. The single debuted at number 79 on the Mega Top 100 in the Netherlands. After a performance during the finals of So You Think You Can Dance, the song moved up the chart to number 60. Lloyd released her debut studio album, Sticks + Stones, on 4 November 2011. The record entered the UK Albums Chart at number four, and peaked at number seven in Ireland. The album sold 55,668 copies in its opening week. The second single, "With Ur Love", featuring American singer Mike Posner, debuted on the UK Singles Chart at number four with first-week sales of 74,030 copies. The song sold more than the first single,  when it debuted at number one in August 2011, selling 66,316 copies. "With Ur Love" also marks the highest-selling number-four single since Rihanna's "Only Girl (In the World)," which sold 74,248 copies in 2010. The third single, "Want U Back", featuring American rapper Astro, debuted at number 56, and rose 30 places to number 26 with sales of 9,730.

In November 2011, Lloyd announced her debut headlining UK tour, the Sticks and Stones Tour, which took place in March and April 2012. On 13 December, a music video for "Dub on the Track," featuring underground artists Mic Righteous, Dot Rotten and Ghetts, who also all appear in the accompanying video, premiered on SBTV. In December 2011, two more dates were added to the due to popular demand for tickets. In October 2011, Lloyd signed to Logan Media Entertainment under the management of Craig Logan, John Black and Christie LaRocque.

In December 2011, Lloyd signed a record deal with L.A. Reid to Epic Records in the United States; a solo version of "Want U Back" was confirmed as Lloyd's debut single in the US and the first one from the American and Australian release of Sticks and Stones. The song was released in May 2012 and debuted at number 75 on the Billboard Hot 100 chart before rising to number 12. It also peaked at number 9 on Billboard Pop Songs, number 5 on Digital Songs, number 39 on the Hot 100 Airplay, and number 23 on Adult Pop Songs. It also debuted at number 95 on the Canadian Hot 100 chart and peaked at number 11. As of February 2013, the track has sold over 2,000,000 copies in the US, and almost 3,000,000 copies worldwide. The second US single, "Oath", featuring American rapper Becky G, was released on October, but failed to match its predecessor's success, peaking at number 73 in the US Billboard Hot 100. In New Zealand, following the major success of "Want U Back," which reached number 3, "Oath" made a respectable impact, peaking at number 13, becoming Lloyd's third consecutive Top 20 hit in that country. The American and Australian versions of Sticks and Stones were released on 2 October 2012, through Epic Records. This edition peaked at number nine in the US selling 32,948 copies in its opening week; it has sold more than 250,000 copies in the country as of September 2017. The album reached number thirty in Australia.  In October 2012, Lloyd supported American band Hot Chelle Rae on the Australian leg of their Whatever World Tour.

2013–2015: Sorry I'm Late and hiatus
Months after the release of Sticks + Stones, Lloyd confirmed reports that recording had begun for her second studio album, with new songwriters and producers such as Beth Ditto and Tove Lo. In January 2013, Lloyd announced that she would guest-star on Big Time Rush. In April 2013, Lloyd announced she and Ne-Yo were to collaborate on a new Fruttare song, "It's All Good," which premiered in June of that year. In November 2013, during an interview with Larry King, Lloyd confirmed that she had left Syco Music after she and Cowell disagreed about her career path in music. Lloyd also confirmed that the album, which was originally due for release in November, was pushed back until early 2014, despite the record being done.

She also revealed that her I Wish Tour would take place in the fall of 2013 and that girl group Fifth Harmony would serve as the opening act. In May 2014, Lloyd was featured on "Really Don't Care", the fourth single off Demi Lovato's fourth album Demi, which peaked at number one on the US Dance chart and debuted on the Billboard Hot 100 at number 98 before rising to peak position number 26.

Lloyd's second studio album, Sorry I'm Late, was released on 23 May 2014, and peaked on the US Billboard 200 chart at number 12. The album peaked at number 58 on the Irish Albums Chart, while it debuted at number 21 on the UK Albums Chart. The lead single, "I Wish", featuring American rapper T.I., debuted within the US on the Billboard Bubbling Under Hot 100 Singles chart at number 17. It also charted on the ARIA Singles Chart at number 40 and on New Zealand at number 16. The second single, "Sirens", peaked on the US Billboard Pop Digital Songs chart at number 48. Also the song charted on the UK Singles Chart at number 41. The album sold 41,000 copies in the US despite the little chart success.

Following the release of Sorry I'm Late, Lloyd was removed from Epic's website, leading to the suspicion that she had been dropped by the label. In November 2014, it was revealed that Lloyd had signed a new deal with Universal Music Group and was working on her third studio album.

2016–present: Upcoming third studio album and new label
Lloyd broke her silence in March 2016 by posting a video on her social media pages. In the video, Lloyd states: "I just want to say thank you so much for being so patient. It's been a while but it's definitely worth the wait and I can't wait for everybody to hear it." Lloyd stated in an interview with New You Media that her third album is almost finished. On 15 July 2016, Lloyd teased the release of her new song, "Activated", on social media; the song premiered on 22 July 2016. In May 2017, Lloyd announced that she had signed with ie:music.

In 2018, she was the featured vocalist on the track "4U" by Swedish producer Joakim Molitor. On 19 October 2018, Lloyd released the single "None of My Business" along with the music video. On 11 October 2019, she released the single "M.I.A". The song will be the lead single from her upcoming third studio album. On 24 April 2020, Lloyd premiered the single "Lost" alongside the music video.

Artistry

Musical style

As a musical artist, Lloyd has been described as an "expressive, playful R&B" artist, with a "unique blend of pop smarts and urban attitude." She stated in a BBC article that, "I feel like I've finally entered this new phase of my career where it's totally authentic" in regards to her music career.
"When you enter the music industry at such a young age [...] I had to grow up and discover who I was and how I want to be heard. I've got nothing to hide any more. My music is 100% me. It's been me going into sessions and me writing the songs. I'm not from a big machine, and I'm not stuck on the conveyor belt that I used to be on. I've jumped off, and that's really scary. But at the same time, super empowering"
Early in her career, Lloyd was known for her "infectious pop-rap, charting hits," ranging from songs such as "Swagger Jagger" and "Want U Back" to her collaborations "Really Don't Care" with Demi Lovato and "Oath" with Becky G. With the release of "None of My Business" and "M.I.A", she began to take a more mature approach to her work in what Rolling Stone described as a "mature phase." She is often described as pop-rap artist.

Influences 
Lloyd revealed in an interview that she is a fan of Dolly Parton. Lloyd has cited rapper Nicki Minaj as an influence and said that she looks up to Minaj for her "attitude" around "doing what you feel like doing and be who you are." Lloyd went on to say that Minaj "has helped change pop music ... and there's no denying it."

Personal life

In January 2012, Lloyd announced her engagement to her boyfriend of less than a year, Craig Monk. They were married in 2013. In May 2018, they had their first child, a daughter.

Filmography

Discography

 Sticks and Stones (2011)
 Sorry I'm Late (2014)

Tours
Headlining
 Sticks and Stones Tour (2012)
 I Wish Tour (2013)

Supporting
 X Factor Tour 2011
 Whatever World Tour 
 The Red Tour 
 The Neon Lights Tour

Awards and nominations

See also
List of artists who reached number one on the UK Singles Chart

References

 
1993 births
Living people
21st-century English women singers
21st-century English singers
English female models
English women rappers
English women singer-songwriters
British contemporary R&B singers
English sopranos
English Romani people
Epic Records artists
Musicians from Worcestershire
People from Malvern, Worcestershire
The X Factor (British TV series) contestants
Universal Music Group artists
Romani singers
Pop rappers
British hip hop singers
21st-century women rappers
British women hip hop musicians